No Tears For Ananse is a Ghanaian movie which was directed by Sam Aryeetey and written by Ato Kwamina Yanney in 1968.

Plot
Folklore film describe how cunning Ananse tries to outwit his family because of the pressure of him providing his family members every day. He pretended dead and he told his family to bury him in his farm, he thereby was eaten the food staff in the farm when its late. The family set a trap using a statue smeared with glue. When Ananse saw the statue he taught it was a living being so he started kick and slapping it and he was stuck. The following morning he was caught by the family and villagers.

Cast
 Kofi Middleton Mends
 David London
 Lily Nketia

References

Ghanaian drama films
1968 films
English-language Ghanaian films
1960s English-language films